Ezhai Padum Padu is a 1950 Indian Tamil language film directed by K. Ramnoth. It was simultaneously shot in Telugu as Beedala Patlu. It was an adaptation of Les Misérables, Victor Hugo's 1862 novel. The film was released on Diwali day. For his memorable portrayal of Javert in this film, N. Seetharaman came to be called as Javert Seetharaman. It was produced by S. M. Sriramulu Naidu of Pakshiraja Studios.

Plot 
Tough and ruthless Police Inspector Javert recaptures a small-time criminal Kandhan who has escaped from prison. Kandhan turns a new leaf with the help of a Christian Bishop. When he is released from prison he starts a glass making company. He changes his identity and becomes successful. He becomes the mayor of his town. Inspector Javert finds out about his new life and threatens to expose him. On one occasion Kandhan saves Javert's life. Javert commits suicide unable to turn Kandhan in to the authorities out of his sense of gratitude.

Cast 
Cast according to the opening credits of the film

Male Cast
 V. Nagayya as Kandhan Dayalan 
 T. S. Balaiah as Ramgopal
 T. S. Durairaj as Masilamani Mudaliar
 Serukulathur Sama as Christian Bishop (Saadhu Uthamar)
 N. Seetharaman as Inspector Javar
 V. Gopalakrishnan as Umakandhan
 Kali N. Rathnam as Nagam
 M. R. Swaminathan as Nagan's Cousin
 S. Peer Mohamed as Vedhagiri Mudaliar
 Nat Annaji Rao as Judge
 T. K. Kalyanam as Ranga Das
 Male Support Cast
K. S. Kanaiah, S. V. Shanmugam Pillai, S. V. Shanmugam, V. S. Rao, Manickam

Female Cast
 Lalitha as Anjala
 Padmini as Lakshmi
 Kumari N. Rajam as Rajam
 P. S. Gnanam as Naagi
 S. R. Janaki as Kandhan's Sister
 Baby Meenakshi as Baby Lakshmi
 Ragini as Female Dancer
 Thangam as Female Dancer
 Kalyani as Female Dancer
 Rita as Female Dancer
 Janaki as Female Dancer
 Radhamani as Female Dancer

Production 
Ezhai Padum Padu was produced by S. M. Sriramulu Naidu at Pakshiraja Studios in Coimbatore. K. Ramnoth was hired as the director and V. Nagayya was cast as Kandan (based on Jean Valjean). Initially, Nagercoil K. Mahadevan, was cast as the bishop who reforms the thief. But after a few scenes were shot, Sriramulu Naidu replaced him with Serukalathur Sama. Elangovan (Thanigachalam) wrote the script for Ezhai Padum Paau based on Sudhanandha Bharathi's translation of Les Miserables. Sriramulu Naidu was known for his strict schedule. Once when director Ramnoth was absent from the set, one of the actors – V. Gopalakrishnan – left the set thinking that there would be no filming on that day. An incensed Naidu filmed the scene (a love song sequence) using an actress (Ragini) dressed up as a man instead of Gopalakrishnan.

Soundtrack 
The soundtrack had ten songs composed by S. M. Subbaiah Naidu. The lyrics by V. A. Gopalakrishnan.

Tamil Soundtrack

Telugu Soundtrack
Music is by S. M. Subbaiah Naidu and G. Aswathama. Lyrics were by Aarudhra.

Release and reception 
Ezhai Padum Padu was released on Diwali day (9 November), 1950. It was a commercial and critical success.

See also 
 Adaptations of Les Misérables

References

Bibliography

External links 
 
 

1950 films
1950s multilingual films
1950s Tamil-language films
1950s Telugu-language films
Films based on Les Misérables
Films directed by K. Ramnoth
Films scored by S. M. Subbaiah Naidu
Indian black-and-white films
Indian multilingual films

eo:Beedala Patlu